Mama Sana (1900–1997) was a Tandroy singer and performer of traditional airs on the valiha tube zither, the national instrument of Madagascar. She was a charismatic performer and dressed in traditional clothing with coins braided into her hair. Sana gained national and international acclaim over the course of her career, distinguished by her innovative reinvention of the valiha performance technique and her fusion of traditional Tandroy and Sakalava musical styles.

Mama Sana recorded several solo albums before her death in 1997. Her music was sampled by French electro-pop new age band Deep Forest for their third album, Comparsa. After her death, Sana's house was converted to a museum and a cultural association was founded in her honor to promote traditional music of the Sakalava and Tandroy people.

Discography

See also
Music of Madagascar

Notes

References
 

20th-century Malagasy women singers
1900 births
1997 deaths